Charles Brooke Longbottom  (22 July 1930 – 5 February 2013) was a British barrister, businessman and Conservative politician. In his later years his interest turned to Christian healing and education.

He was appointed Officer of the Order of the British Empire (OBE) in the 2012 New Year Honours for public and charitable services.

Early career
Longbottom was educated at Uppingham School,  and then read for the Bar, being called in 1958 by the Inner Temple. He was interested in politics from an early age and was Vice Chairman of the Young Conservatives Advisory Committee in 1953–54; while a student he was part of the United Kingdom delegation to the World Assembly of Youth Services in Genval, Belgium.

Parliament
After fighting Stockton-on-Tees in the 1955 general election, Longbottom was selected for York and won the seat in the 1959 general election. Iain Macleod, the Leader of the House of Commons, picked him as his Parliamentary Private Secretary in 1961; he served until Macleod went out of office in 1963.

Maritime business career
After losing his seat at the 1966 general election, Longbottom went into the shipbuilding business. He was chairman of Austin & Pickersgill shipbuilders (based in Sunderland) from 1966 to 1972, and of A&P Appledore International Ltd from 1970 to 1979. He joined Seascope in 1970 and was chairman of several subsidiary companies. In the 1980s his business career diversified into financial services and was a Director of Henry Ansbacher & Co from 1982 to 1987.

Although not attempting a return into politics, Longbottom was considered for public appointments. He had been made a member of the General Advisory Committee of the BBC in 1965 and served ten years, and was also a member of the Community Relations Commission from 1968 to 1970.

Activities after retirement
Charles Longbottom served 16 years as a Director of British Shipbuilders, and as Chairman of MC Shipping Inc. from 2004 to 2010.

However his main interest lay in Christian healing and education. He was Chairman of Acorn Christian Healing Trust and the Acorn Christian Foundation from 1988 to 2001. He was Chairman of the Awareness Foundation from its founding in 2003 until the middle of 2012.

Death
He became ill in the summer of 2012 and died at the Royal Marsden Hospital on 5 February 2013 at the age of 82.

References
"Longbottom, Charles Brooke" in "Who's Who" (A&C Black)
M. Stenton and S. Lees, "Who's Who of British MPs" Vol. IV (Harvester Press, 1981)
"Times Guide to the House of Commons 1955"

Footnotes

External links
 
Profile at the Awareness Foundation.

1930 births
People educated at Uppingham School
Conservative Party (UK) MPs for English constituencies
UK MPs 1959–1964
UK MPs 1964–1966
Members of the Inner Temple
British businesspeople in shipping
Officers of the Order of the British Empire
2013 deaths
20th-century British businesspeople